Six Gun Territory was a Western-themed theme park in Ocala, Florida, United States. It opened on February 2, 1963 and closed on January 1, 1984.

Southern Railway & Six Gun
One of the principal attractions in Six Gun Territory was the Southern Railway & Six Gun, a narrow gauge heritage railroad. The railroad's former train station, as of July 2016, is located at Kirby Family Farm in Williston, Florida, which has its own narrow gauge train attraction and hosts the Six Gun Territory Wild West Weekend and Reunion event each year.

The railroad utilized two steam locomotives, with details listed in the table below.

See also

Ghost Town Village
New Life Ranch Frontier Cove
Silver Springs (attraction)
Wild Waters

References

External links

Kirby Family Farm
Six Gun Territory

1963 establishments in Florida
1984 disestablishments in Florida
3 ft gauge railways in the United States
Amusement parks closed in 1984
Amusement parks opened in 1963
Defunct amusement parks in Florida
Defunct Florida railroads
Heritage railroads in Florida
History of Silver Springs, Florida
Narrow gauge railroads in Florida
Western (genre) theme parks